Walter John Francis Erskine, 12th Earl of Mar and 14th Earl of Kellie  (29 August 1865 – 3 June 1955) was a Scottish nobleman.

Biography
The eldest son of Walter Erskine, 11th Earl of Mar and Mary Anne Forbes, he was educated at Eton and served as a 2nd lieutenant and then lieutenant in the Scots Guards from 1887–92.

He succeeded his father in 1888, and in 1892 married Lady Violet Ashley-Cooper, daughter of Anthony Ashley-Cooper, 8th Earl of Shaftesbury. They had three children:
 Elyne Violet Erskine (born-died 2 August 1893)
 Major John Francis Ashley Erskine, Lord Erskine (26 April 1895 – 3 May 1953)
 Captain Hon. Francis Walter Erskine (9 January 1899 – 1972)

He was a Scottish Representative Peer from 1892–1950, and held office as Lord Lieutenant of Clackmannanshire from 1898 and Lord Clerk Register and Keeper of the Signet from 1936–44. He was also Hereditary Keeper of Stirling Castle, and Honorary Colonel of the 7th Battalion Argyll and Sutherland Highlanders. He was successively Brigadier, Ensign, Lieutenant, and Captain in the Royal Company of Archers

He was appointed a Knight of the Thistle in the 1911 Coronation Honours and was Chancellor of the Order from 1932–49. His son, John, having predeceased him, he was succeeded by his grandson, John Erskine, Earl of Mar and Kellie (1921-1993).

References

1865 births
1955 deaths
Kellie, Walter Erskine Earl of Mar and
14
Knights of the Thistle
Lord-Lieutenants of Clackmannanshire
People educated at Eton College
Scottish representative peers
Walter
Scots Guards officers
Scottish justices of the peace